A secondary atmosphere is an atmosphere of a planet that did not form by accretion during the formation of the planet's star. A secondary atmosphere instead forms from internal volcanic activity, or by accumulation of material from comet impacts. It is characteristic of terrestrial planets, which includes the other terrestrial planets in the Solar System: Mercury, Venus, and Mars. Secondary atmospheres are relatively thin compared to primary atmospheres like Jupiter's. Further processing of a secondary atmosphere, for example by the processes of biological life, can produce a tertiary atmosphere, such as that of Earth.

References

Atmosphere
Atmospheric sciences
Planetary atmospheres